Minuscule 608 (in the Gregory-Aland numbering), OΘ 44 (von Soden), is a Greek minuscule manuscript of the New Testament, on parchment. Palaeographically it has been assigned to the 14th century. The manuscript has complex contents. Formerly it was labeled by 129a and 156p.

Description 

The codex contains the text of the Acts of the Apostles, Catholic epistles, Pauline epistles on 388 parchment leaves (size ). The text is written in two columns per page, 41 and more lines per page. Scrivener noted: "The text is sometimes suppressed". The text of the Catholic epistles is surrounded by a catena.

The order of books: Acts, Pauline epistles, and Catholic. Epistle to the Hebrews is placed after Epistle to Philemon.

Text 

The Greek text of the codex is a mixture of text-types. Aland did not place it in any Category.

History 

The manuscript was added to the list of New Testament manuscripts by Johann Martin Augustin Scholz. It was slightly examined by Scholz and Paulin Martin. Gregory saw the manuscript in 1885.

Formerly it was labeled by 129a and 156p. In 1908 Gregory gave the number 608 to it.

The manuscript currently is housed at the Bibliothèque nationale de France (Gr. 220), at Paris.

See also 

 List of New Testament minuscules
 Biblical manuscript
 Textual criticism

References

Further reading 

 

Greek New Testament minuscules
14th-century biblical manuscripts
Bibliothèque nationale de France collections